Edmond Leung Hon-man (born 5 November 1971) is a Hong Kong singer-songwriter, record producer, actor and television host.

Background
Born in British Hong Kong on 5 November 1971, he was a youth development footballer and coach until 17. At age 17, Leung became a finalist in the eighth annual New Talent Singing Awards (新秀歌唱大賽) in 1989, which won him a contract with Capital Artists. He made his recording debut in 1990 with the release of Listen to the Edge (細聽鋒芒). He propelled to teen idol stardom in the mid-1990s and was famous for his rather feminine look, in which many of his songs portray the life of timid men dumped by their lovers. He was suspended and barred from performing or appearing on variety shows by TVB for three months after he uttered profanity during a live broadcast of the Tung Wah Charity Show in 1995.

In 2001, Capital Artists failed in the market, and Leung was left contract-less for over a year. During this time, Leung began composing music and was the leader of William So's concert band, while also learning to play the piano. Under the guidance of Paco Wong, he signed to Gold Typhoon in 2003, being marketed as a singer-songwriter. That same year, he released his first album under Gold Typhoon, Number 10, which won Best Album of the Year at the Ultimate Song Chart awards.

Some of his hits include "Thinking Too Much" (自作聰明), "Get Lost/Cheating" (滾, duet with Miriam Yeung), "Hey June", "Battleship Team"  (艦隊), "8 Mile Highway" (八里公路), "Blooming Flowers in 3000 Years" (三千年開花), "Female News Presenter" (新聞女郎), "Beatles" (披頭四), "501", "Seven Friends" (七友), "Fresh Start" (重新做人), "Madam! Madam!" (太太！太太！), "Big Excitement" (大激想, with Eason Chan and Miriam Yeung), "Best Friend" (好朋友), "A Man in the Closet" (衣櫃裡的男人), "Three Wounded Hearts" (傷了三個心), "Love and Emotions" (愛與情), "Lingering Game" (纏綿遊戲), and "Don't Want To Be Alone" (不願一個人).

In 2008, he performed at the S.U.C.C.E.S.S. Charity Gala at Vancouver, British Columbia, Canada with many other artists. He was a co-host of the popular variety show, Beautiful Cooking with Ronald Cheng and Alex Fong.

Discography

Capital Artists releases (1990-2001)

Gold Label releases(2003-2013)

Capital Artists releases (since 2013)

Filmography

TV series
1997: The Disappearance (隱形怪傑)
1999: Street Fighters (廟街·媽·兄弟) as Wong Man-Dik
2002: The Monkey King: Quest for the Sutra (齊天大聖孫悟空) as Tong Sam-Chong
2003: Hearts of Fencing (當四葉草碰上劍尖時) as Chiu Chui-Shuet (Mr. Sword)
2007: ICAC 2007 (廉政行動2007之沙丘城堡) as Leung Chi-Kit
2008: Dressage to Win (盛裝舞步愛作戰) as himself
2008: Taste of Happiness (幸福的味道) as Ray
2018: Shadow of Justice (蝕日風暴) 裴天成

Variety shows
2006: Beautiful Cooking (美女廚房)
2009: Beautiful Cooking II (美女廚房2)
2021: Call Me By Fire (披荆斩棘的哥哥)

Films
1996: 金枝玉葉II
1996: 正牌香蕉俱樂部
1996: 運財至叻星
1996: 金田一手稿之奇異檔案
1996: Mongkok Story (旺角風雲)
1996: 假男假女
1997: Legend of the Wolf (戰狼傳說)
1997: 蘭桂坊七公主
1997: 我有我瘋狂
1998: 戇豆豆追女仔
1998: 對不起，隊林你
1998: 烈火青春
1999: 有時跳舞
2000: 藍煙火
2002: 飄忽男女
2002: 夏日冬蔭功
2002: 心跳
2002: Troublesome Night 15 (陰陽路十五之客似魂來)
2002: 橫財就手
2003: 新收數王之貴利王
2003: 魅醒時份
2003: 超級特警
2003: 現代古惑仔
2003: I級暗殺令
2003: 午夜出租
2003: 鬼味人間II：鬼屋幻影
2003: 旺角風雲
2003: 我愛一碌葛
2004: 甜絲絲
2004: 噩夢
2006: 春田花花同學會
2012: I Love Hong Kong 2012
2015: Full Strike
2019: The Calling of a Bus Driver

References

External links
Media Asia Music

1971 births
Living people
Cantopop singer-songwriters
Big Four (band) members
Hong Kong male film actors
Hong Kong film presenters
Hong Kong male singers
Hong Kong record producers
Hong Kong singer-songwriters
Hong Kong male television actors
Hong Kong television presenters
New Talent Singing Awards contestants
20th-century Hong Kong male actors
21st-century Hong Kong male actors